= Cardwell Creek =

Stream in Oregon, United States

Coordinates: 42°28′29″N 123°00′29″W

Cardwell Creek is a stream in the U.S. state of Oregon. It is a tributary to Sams Creek.

Cardwell Creek was named in 1865 after one John A. Cardwell.
